Rodrigo Caro (1573, in Utrera – August 10, 1647 in Seville) was a Spanish priest, historian, archeologist, lawyer, poet and writer.

Works
His principal works include:
Antiguedades y principado de la illustrissima Ciudad de Sevilla, y chorographia de su convento juridico, o antigua chancilleria (Seville, 1654, folio)
Relacion de las inscripciones y antiguedad de la villa de Utrera, (quarto with Latin poem praising the town)
Veterum Hispaniae deorum manes sive reliquiae (book) 
Trattati De ludis puerorum 
De los nombres y sitios de los vientos (Of the names and places of the winds)
De los santos de Sevilla
Del principado de Cordova
De la antiguedad del appellido Caro (Of the antiquity of the surname Caro), dedicated to Don Fernando Caro, Governor of Carmona
 Chronicle falsely attributed to Flavio Lucio Dexter, Elecano, and San Braulion (Seville, 1627)

References

External links
Works by Rodrigo Caro at WorldCat

 

Spanish poets
Spanish Roman Catholic priests
17th-century Latin-language writers
1573 births
1647 deaths
Spanish male poets